Gur Sepid (also Romanized as Gūr Sepīd) is a village in Poshtkuh Rural District, in the Central District of Firuzkuh County, Tehran Province, Iran. At the 2006 census, its population was 92, in 22 families.

References 

Populated places in Firuzkuh County